Club Atlético Argentino de Junín, known simply as Argentino de Junín, is a professional basketball club based in Junín, Buenos Aires Province, Argentina. It was founded in 1938, and its home arena is the Estadio El Fortín de las Morochas, which has recently been remodeled to increase its capacity.

Players

Current roster

External links
 
 C.A. Argentino on LNB

Basketball teams in Argentina
Basketball teams established in 1935